Johannes Bob van Benthem (5 January 1921, Buitenzorg – 11 September 2006, The Hague) was a Dutch lawyer. He was the first president of the European Patent Office (EPO), from 1977 to 1985.

Life 
He obtained a Doctorate in Dutch Law from the University of Amsterdam in 1946. Then, he worked for the Netherlands Patent Office (Octrooiraad), first as a lawyer starting in 1946, then later on as President of the Netherlands Patent Office from 1968 to 1977, prior to working at the European Patent Office (EPO). "He was awarded honorary doctorates by the law faculties of Munich and Strasbourg Universities."

Legacy
Since the beginning of December 2007, a street near the buildings of the European Patent Office in Rijswijk, near The Hague, Netherlands, is named after him. More particularly, "the stretch of Koopmansstraat between Tinbergenstraat and Limpergstraat [is] known as Van Benthemlaan". In October 2013, the address of the EPO headquarters in Munich was also renamed in his honor.

References

External links
 Romuald Singer Memorial Lecture held by Johannes Bob van Benthem at the Patent Forum 1992 in Munich, Germany

1921 births
2006 deaths
20th-century Dutch lawyers
European Patent Organisation people
People from Bogor